St Paul's Church is a Church of England church in Winchmore Hill, London Borough of Enfield. It was originally consecrated in 1828 as a chapel-of-ease to the Church of All Saints, Edmonton, and built as a Waterloo church on land donated from the Grovelands estate.  The church ceiling was said to be the largest unsupported expanse of plasterwork in Europe until its renovation in the 1960s introduced concealed supports.

Memorials
While a covenant was placed that no burials should take place on the donated land, there is a small garden of remembrance and a number of other memorials. The Garden of Rest, to the south of the church, was set apart in 1961 for the burial of cremated remains.

Curates and vicars

Curates
 1828-1834 T. Bisland
 1834-1851 E. B. Warren

Vicars
 1851-1874 J. D. Frost
 1874-1901 A. C. Drought
 1901- A. J. B. Dewdney
 Francis Lampen
 David Nash
 Lacuna
 John Paul

References

External links
 

Winchmore Hill
19th-century Church of England church buildings
Churches completed in 1828
Church of England church buildings in the London Borough of Enfield
Commissioners' church buildings
Religious organizations established in 1828